Kashf al-Yaqin or Kashf al-Yaqin fi Faḍā'il Amīr al-Mu'minīn (Arabic: کشف الیقین)(English: Certainty Uncovered) is a short book on the excellence and virtues of Imam Ali ('Alī Ibn Abī Ṭālib'), the first Imam of Shi’ites in Islam religion, which is written by Allameh Hilli, a prolific author and well-known Shi’ite scholar.

Author
The great Sheikh, Jamal al-Din Abu-Mansur Hasan, is the son of Sadid al-Din Yusuf, the son of Zayn al-Din `Ali, the son of Muhammad, the son of Mutahhar, known as `Allamah Hilli and `Allamah `ala al-Itlaq.

Sheikh `Amili, in (his book on) Tadhkirat al-Mutabahhirin, says, “Sheikh `Allamah Jamal al-Din Abu-Mansur, Hasan ibn Yusuf ibn `Ali ibn Mutahhar Hilli, is a pure learned scholar, most well-versed of all scholars, researcher, trustworthy, jurisprudent, traditionalist, theologian, and a dignified man unrivaled in the rational and transmitted science. His virtues cannot be counted.”

He was taught theology and rational science by Muhaqqiq Hilli and Muhaqqiq Tusi. Muhaqqiq Tusi also learned jurisprudence (Fiqh) from him. Hasan ibn `Ali ibn Dawud, writing about him in his book, says, “He was a great Shi`ite scholar of his time, having numerous books and leading Imamiyyah in the rational and transmitted sciences in his time. His honorable father, may his soul rest in peace, was a dignified jurisprudent and lecturer.”

Motive of Writing

During the life of `Allamah Hilli, Sultan Khodabandeh chose Shi’ism as his sect, had coins minted in the name of the twelve Imams and had it circulated in the country in AH 708. Allameh Hilli wrote the book on the request of Sultan Khodabandeh.

Content
The author divided the book in one preface and four parts. Some of the chapters of the book are as follow:
 Ali's virtues before his death
 Ali's virtues in boyhood and maturity
 Ali's generosity and magnanimity
 Ali's courage in battle of Khandaq
 The unity of Ali and the holy prophet
 Virtues of Ali's spouse
 The holy prophet's prayer for Ali
 Ali and the Aide of the holy prophet and Fatimah
 Ali's posthumous miracles

Characters
In Kashf al-Yaqin, most of the resources referred to are Sunni sources such as Mosanad Ahmad, Manaqib Kharazmi, Khasaes of Tabari, Al Yavaqit,  Asbab Al Nozul Al Vahedi and Manaqib of Ibn Maqadili. Allameh Majlesi is also referred to and used of the book in the book of Al Bihar.

Translation
This book is translated from its original Arabic into several languages, including Persian and English. The English translation of Kashf al-Yaqin is made by Dr. Ali Akabar Aghili Ashtiani. The book also has four Persian translations as follow:

 Rashaf Al Moeen by Majd Al Udaba
 A translation by unknown author
 A translation by Hamid Reza Azir
 The mirror of certainty by Sayyed Mojtaba Alavi Tarakamahei

References

Religious books